"Guaglione" is a Neapolitan song with music by Giuseppe Fanciulli and words by Nicola "Nisa" Salerno. This original version of the song was the winning song at the IV Festival di Napoli which was broadcast on radio in 1956. Guaglione is Neapolitan for "boy", but as slang can mean "street urchin", "corner boy", etc. The word guaglione has appeared as "wallyo" in New York immigrant slang.

The song has been covered by various artists, including Italian bandleader Renzo Arbore, and Italian singers Claudio Villa, Aurelio Fierro, Renato Carosone and Dalida. Under the title "The Man Who Plays the Mandolino", with a lyric in English, Dean Martin sang it in 1956 after Fred Raphael of Walt Disney Music Company obtained for Disney the U.S. publishing rights. The English lyrics were inspired by a little known Italian singer/songwriter Lucca Belvedere, a Mandolino player of some renown. Connie Francis recorded the song in the original Italian language for her 1960 album More Italian Favorites.

The best-known version of "Guaglione" was recorded by the Cuban bandleader Perez Prado in 1958 as an uptempo mambo tune. As a mambo, the track rose to fame in 1994 and 1995 after it was used for the Guinness advert "Anticipation", which led to the song being released as a single, reaching number one in Ireland and number two in the United Kingdom. It has since been featured as the intro music for the 1996 video game Kingdom O' Magic, and more recently as the opening music for the television show Jimmy's Farm. The song is one of Disney's biggest profit makers.
Marino Marini's version was featured in the film The Talented Mr. Ripley. In 2006 Patrizio Buanne recorded an English version, lyrics by Steve Crosby (music), titled Bella bella signorina for his album Forever Begins Tonight.

1994 and 1995 release
As a mambo, "Guaglione" rose to fame in 1994 and 1995 after it was used for the Guinness advert "Anticipation", which led to the song being released as a single, reaching number one in Ireland and number two in the United Kingdom. The advert first aired in Ireland in 1994, giving way for "Guaglione" to top the Irish Singles Chart. At the same time, another Guinness advert titled "Recursive" began airing in the UK, this one using Louis Armstrong's "We Have All the Time in the World" as a soundtrack. The rights to release the song as a single were difficult to obtain, and by the time the track was cleared for release, "Anticipation" had begun airing in the UK, leading to a concurrent release of "Guaglione" and "We Have All the Time in the World". Demand for the latter song was higher, so Guinness replaced "Anticipation" with "Recursive" on television and abandoned their promotion of "Guaglione", leading it to chart on import copies only. In early 1995, "Anticipation" began airing in the UK properly, allowing for a re-release of "Guaglione".

Critical reception
Pan-European magazine Music & Media wrote, "Fuelled by a TV ad for Guinness, the King of mambo reclaims his throne. Guaglione takes you back to the days when organists played in cinemas during the intervals."

Charts

Weekly charts

Year-end charts

Certifications

References

1956 songs
1994 singles
Irish Singles Chart number-one singles
Neapolitan songs
Pérez Prado songs
Songs written by Nicola Salerno